Miguel Bernardo Bianquetti (born 19 December 1951), known as Migueli, is a Spanish retired footballer who played as a central defender.

A player of immense physical power – he was nicknamed Tarzan– he was best known for his Barcelona spell, which lasted almost 20 professional years.

Migueli appeared with the Spain national team at the 1978 World Cup and Euro 1980.

Club career
Migueli was born in Ceuta. After playing with Cádiz CF from 1970 to 1973, competing in the Segunda División, he transferred to La Liga giants FC Barcelona, where he became an undisputed starter after just one league game in his first year, going on to play 391 matches in the competition (549 overall, club's all-time best until 5 January 2011, when Xavi surpassed him in a Copa del Rey match against Athletic Bilbao); whilst he was performing his compulsory military service in Cádiz he made his official debut for the latter, and upon his return, not aware that he needed two special permits to leave the headquarters, he was jailed for one month.

In the final of the 1978–79 European Cup Winners' Cup against Fortuna Düsseldorf, Migueli played parts of the match, which went to extra time, with a broken collarbone, in an eventual 4–3 win. In the 1986–87 season, already well into his 30s, he still managed to make 41 appearances – 38 complete – and retired at the end of the following campaign, in which he added another domestic cup.

Subsequently, Migueli worked with the Catalan club's coaching staffs in the Joan Gaspart presidency. On 17 September 2010, he was chosen by new chairman Sandro Rosell as sporting advisor alongside Josep Maria Fusté and Carles Rexach.

International career
Migueli earned 32 caps and scored one goal for Spain, his debut coming on 20 November 1974 in a 2–1 win in Scotland for the UEFA Euro 1976 qualifiers. He represented the nation at the 1978 FIFA World Cup and Euro 1980, for a total of four appearances.

Career statistics

Club

International
Score and result list Spain's goal tally first, score column indicates score after Migueli goal.

Honours
Barcelona
La Liga: 1973–74, 1984–85
Copa del Rey: 1977–78, 1980–81, 1982–83, 1987–88
Supercopa de España: 1983
Copa de la Liga: 1983, 1986
UEFA Cup Winners' Cup: 1978–79, 1981–82

Individual
Best Spanish Player: 1977–78, 1984–85

Notelist

References

External links

1951 births
Living people
People from Ceuta
Spanish footballers
Footballers from Ceuta
Association football defenders
La Liga players
Segunda División players
Cádiz CF players
FC Barcelona players
Spain amateur international footballers
Spain international footballers
1978 FIFA World Cup players
UEFA Euro 1980 players